Jean-François Di Martino (born 2 March 1967) is a French fencer. He won a silver medal in the team épée event at the 2000 Summer Olympics.

References

External links
 

1967 births
Living people
French male épée fencers
Olympic fencers of France
Fencers at the 1992 Summer Olympics
Fencers at the 2000 Summer Olympics
Olympic silver medalists for France
Olympic medalists in fencing
People from Enghien-les-Bains
Fencers from Paris
Medalists at the 2000 Summer Olympics
Sportspeople from Val-d'Oise
20th-century French people